Cardiovascular fitness is a health-related component of physical fitness that is brought about by sustained physical activity.  A person's ability to deliver oxygen to the working muscles is affected by many physiological parameters, including heart rate, stroke volume, cardiac output, and maximal oxygen consumption.

Understanding the relationship between cardiorespiratory fitness and other categories of conditioning requires a review of changes that occur with increased aerobic, or anaerobic capacity. As aerobic/anaerobic capacity increases, general metabolism rises, muscle metabolism is enhanced, haemoglobin rises, buffers in the bloodstream increase, venous return is improved, stroke volume is improved, and the blood bed becomes more able to adapt readily to varying demands. Each of these results of cardiovascular fitness/cardiorespiratory conditioning will have a direct positive effect on muscular endurance, and an indirect effect on strength and flexibility.

To facilitate optimal delivery of oxygen to the working muscles, an individual needs to train or participate in activities that will build up the energy stores needed for sport. This is referred to as metabolic training. Metabolic training is generally divided into two types: aerobic and anaerobic. A 2005 Cochrane review demonstrated that physical activity interventions are effective for increasing cardiovascular fitness.

References

Cardiovascular physiology
Aerobic exercise
Exercise physiology
Physical fitness